James Joseph Byrnes (January 5, 1880 – July 31, 1941) was an American Major League Baseball catcher. He played for the Philadelphia Athletics during the  season.

References

Major League Baseball catchers
Philadelphia Athletics players
Baseball players from California
1880 births
1941 deaths
Minor league baseball managers
Oakland Reliance players
Oakland Oaks (baseball) players
San Francisco (minor league baseball) players
Oakland Commuters players
Portland Beavers players
Sacramento Senators players
Sacramento Sacts players
Tacoma Tigers players
Los Angeles Angels (minor league) players